The Eastern Command is one of the six operational commands of the Indian Army. It is headquartered in Fort William in the city of Kolkata in the state of West Bengal. The Eastern Command was formed on 1 November 1920. The Command is commanded by a three-star rank officer with the title General Officer Commanding-in-Chief (GOC-in-C). 

Lieutenant General Rana Pratap Kalita is the current GOC-in-C of Eastern Command.

History

Early history
The Presidency armies were abolished with effect from 1 April 1895 when the three Presidency armies of Bengal, Bombay, and Madras became the Indian Army. The Indian Army was divided into four Commands: Bengal Command, Bombay Command, Madras Command and Punjab Command, each under a lieutenant general.

Between 1904 and 1908, the Bengal Command became the Eastern Command. In 1908, the four commands were merged into two Armies – Northern Army and Southern Army – as recommended by the then Commander-in-Chief, Indian Army, Lord Kitchener. This system persisted until 1920 when the arrangement reverted to four commands again: Eastern Command, Northern Command, Southern Command and Western Command.

On 1 November 1920, the Eastern Command was formed, with its summer headquarters in Nainital and winter headquarters in Lucknow. General Sir Havelock Hudson, become its first Commander.

Second World War
In 1942, the command had the following formations under it:
 IV Corps (Headquarters at Imphal)
 17th Indian Infantry Division and 23rd Indian Infantry Division
 XXXIII Corps (Headquarters at Arakan)
 14th Indian Infantry Division and 26th Indian Infantry Division
 70th British Division and 50th Indian Tank Brigade in reserve.

In Apr 1942, the command was re-designated as Eastern Army and its headquarters moved to Barrackpore to fight the World War II. The Chindits were raised and launched into operations in 1943, by the 77th Indian Infantry Brigade, a unit of the Eastern Command.

In October 1943, the Fourteenth Army was formed and was given responsibility of the area east of the Meghna River. With this, the Eastern Army retained responsibility of the area west of the river.

After the war, on 23 March 1947, the Command HQ moved to Ranchi. The HQ was later moved to Lucknow in 1955. However on 1 May 1963, post Sino-Indian War; the Central Command was re-raised and Lucknow was made its HQ, while Kolkata was made HQ Eastern Command.

Indo-Pakistani War of 1971

The Command had the overall responsibility of the eastern theatre of the 13-day war. The command had the two existing infantry corps – IV Corps and XXXIII Corps and raised another – II Corps. Apart from this, the 101 Communication Zone was re-organised as a Division-sized combat formation.
Lieutenant General J S Arora, as the General Officer Commanding-in-Chief Eastern Command, commanded all Indian and Bangladesh Forces in the eastern theatre. 
The Order of Battle of the Eastern Command during the war was:

II Corps (HQ - Krishnanagar) (GOC - Lieutenant General T N Raina)

 50th Independent Parachute Brigade (less 2 Para Bn Gp) – Brigadier M Thomas
 8th Mountain Artillery Brigade
 58th, 68th and 263rd Engineering Regiments

 9th Infantry Division (GOC - Major General Dalbir Singh)
 32 Infantry Brigade – Brigadier M Tewari
 42 Infantry Brigade – Brigadier J. M. Jhoria
 350 Infantry Brigade – Brigadier H. S. Sandhu
 9th Artillery Brigade

 4th Mountain Division (HQ - Krishnanagar) (GOC - Major General M S Barar)
 7th Mountain Brigade – Brigadier Zail Singh
 41st Mountain Brigade – Brigadier Tony Michigan
 62nd Mountain Brigade - Brigadier Rajinder Nath 
 4th Mountain Artillery Brigade

IV Corps (HQ - Agartala) GOC - Lieutenant General Sagat Singh 
 Corps Artillery Brigade
 Three Independent Tank Squadrons

 8th Mountain Division (GOC - Major General K. V. Krishna Rao)
 Echo Force Brigade – Brigadier Wadeker
 59th Mountain Brigade – Brigadier C. A. Quinn
 81st Mountain Brigade – Brigadier R. C. V. Apte 
 2nd Mountain Artillery Brigade 

 57th Mountain Division (GOC - Major General B.F. Gonsalves)
 311th Mountain Brigade – Brigadier Mishra
 73rd Mountain Brigade – Brigadier Tuli
 61st Mountain Brigade – Brigadier Tom Pande
 57th Mountain Artillery Brigade 

23rd Mountain Division (GOC - Major General R.D. Hira)

 301st Mountain Brigade – Brigadier H. S. Sodhi
 181st Mountain Brigade – Brigadier Y. C. Bakshi
 83rd Mountain Brigade – Brigadier B. S. Sandhu 
 23rd Mountain Artillery Brigade
 Kilo Force Brigade – Brigadier Ananda Swaroop containing: 
 Mizo Range Hills Brigade

XXXIII Corps (HQ - Siliguri) (GOC - Lieutenant General M L Thapan)

 Corps Artillery Brigade
 471st Engineering Brigade – Colonel Suri
 235th Army Engineering Regiment
 2 Para Bn Gp
 MF Brigade – Brigadier Prem Singh
 71st Mountain Brigade – Brigadier P. N. Kathpalia

 20th Mountain Division (HQ - Balurghat) (GOC - Major General Lachhman Singh) 

 66th Mountain Brigade – Brigadier G. S. Sharma
 165th Mountain Brigade – Brigadier R. S. Pannu
 202nd Mountain Brigade – Brigadier F. P. Bhatty
 3rd Armoured Brigade  – Brigadier G. Singh Sidhu
 20th Mountain Artillery Brigade
 340th Mountain Brigade Group – Brigadier Joginder Singh

 6th Mountain Division ( HQ - Cooch Behar) (Eastern Command HQ Reserve) (GOC - Major General P C Reddy)
 9th Mountain Brigade – Brigadier Tirit Varma
 99th Mountain Brigade
 6th Mountain Artillery Brigade

101st Communication Zone (HQ: Guwahati) (GOC - Major General Gurbax Singh Gill)

 312 Air Defence Brigade
 342 Ind. Air Defence Brigade
 95th Mountain Brigade – Brigadier Hardev Singh Kler
 FJ Sector Brigade – Brigadier Sant Singh
 167th Infantry Brigade – Brigadier Irani (allotted after 8 December 1971)
 5th Mountain Brigade (allotted after 8 December 1971)

On 16 December 1971, the Eastern Command of the Pakistan Armed Forces surrendered at Dhaka. East Pakistan ceased to exist and Bangladesh was born. Lt Gen J S Arora accepted the Pakistani Instrument of Surrender, signed by Lt Gen A. A. K. Niazi at Dacca Racecourse. Approximately 90,000 to 93,000 Pakistani servicemen were taken prisoner by the Indian Army, which included 79,676 to 81,000 uniformed personnel of the Pakistan Armed Forces, including some Bengali soldiers who had remained loyal to Pakistan.

Structure
The Command's Area Of Responsibility (AOR) covers the following states of India:
West Bengal
Sikkim
Assam
Arunachal Pradesh
Nagaland
Manipur
Mizoram
Tripura
Meghalaya
Jharkhand
The Eastern Command has been assigned operational units under: III Corps, IV Corps, XVII Corps, XXXIII Corps and a 23rd Infantry Division.

Precursors (1902–1947) 
Following is the list of precursors to the Eastern Command and their commanders:

Eastern Command (1902–1907)

Eastern Command (1920–1940)

Eastern Army (1942–1943)

Eastern Command (1943–1947)

List of GOC-in-C of Eastern Command (1947–present)

Notes

Further reading 
Richard A. Renaldi; Ravi Rikhe (2011), 'Indian Army Order of Battle', Orbat.com for Tiger Lily Books: A division of General Data LLC, .

Commands of the Indian Army